John Walker (b Litton 13 February 1694 – d Bristol 315 November 1780) was Archdeacon of Dorset from 1762 until his death.

Walker was educated at Balliol College, Oxford, where he  graduated B.A. in 1715. , He held livings at Clevedon and Easton in Gordano. He was a Prebendary of Wells Cathedral.

Notes

1694 births
People from Somerset
Alumni of Balliol College, Oxford
Archdeacons of Dorset
1780 deaths